The Dengese, also known as the Ndengese, are an ethnic group from Democratic Republic of the Congo. They speak Bondengese and Lingala.

External links 
The Dengese of the Democratic Republic of the Congo

African art - Ndenguesé

Ethnic groups in the Democratic Republic of the Congo